Afag is a feminine given name and nickname of Azerbaijani origins. People with this name include: 
 Afag Bashirgyzy (born 1955), Azerbaijani actress
 Afag Malikova (born 1947), Azerbaijani dancer
 Afag Masud (born 1957), Azerbaijani writer

Azerbaijani feminine given names